Samuel Toby Smith (born 8 March 1998) is an English professional footballer who plays as a forward for Cambridge United.

Career

Reading

During the summer of 2017, Smith signed his first professional contract with Reading. He scored his first goal for Reading in an EFL Cup tie against Millwall on 22 August 2017.

In February 2018, Smith signed a new contract with Reading until the summer of 2021.

Bishop's Stortford (loan)

On 26 August 2016, Smith joined Bishop's Stortford on loan until 27 November 2016.

Oxford United (loan)

At the end of July 2018, Smith joined Oxford United of League One on a season-long loan. He made his debut as a substitute in the first match of the league season, a 4–0 away defeat to Barnsley. His first start and home debut came in the following match, a 2–0 defeat to Fleetwood Town. He scored his first goal for Oxford in a 3–0 EFL Trophy win over Fulham Under 21s on 4 September 2018. His loan was ended early at the end of 2018, with Smith's record standing at 3 goals (all in the EFL Trophy) in 23 appearances in all competitions.

Shrewsbury Town (loan)

In January 2019, Smith joined Shrewsbury Town of League One on loan until the end of the 2018–19 Season.

Cambridge United (loan)

On 2 August 2019, Smith was loaned to Cambridge United of League Two until the end of the 2019–20 Season.

Tranmere (loan)

On 16 October 2020, he joined Tranmere Rovers on loan until 7 January 2021. After making five appearances, Smith returned to Reading.

Cheltenham Town (loan)

On 29 January 2021, Smith joined League Two side Cheltenham Town on loan for the remainder of the 2020–21 season.

Release from Reading

On 11 May 2021, Reading announced that Smith would leave the club when his contract expired on 30 June 2021.

Cambridge United

On 7 July 2021, Smith signed a permanent deal with Cambridge United, signing a 2-year contract.

Career statistics

Club

Honours
Cheltenham Town
League Two: 2020–21

References

External links
 
 Reading Profile

1998 births
Living people
Footballers from Manchester
English footballers
Association football forwards
Reading F.C. players
Bishop's Stortford F.C. players
Cambridge United F.C. players
Tranmere Rovers F.C. players
National League (English football) players
English Football League players
Oxford United F.C. players
Cheltenham Town F.C. players